Discovery Park may refer to:

 Discovery Park (Arizona), a scientific research and community area in Safford, Arizona, United States
 Discovery Park (Burnaby), a research community at Burnaby Mountain, Burnaby, British Columbia, Canada
 Discovery Park (Chula Vista), California
 Discovery Park (Hong Kong), a private housing estate in Tsuen Wan New Town, Hong Kong
 Discovery Park (Purdue), a research park at Purdue University, Indiana, United States
 Discovery Park (Sacramento), a park in Sacramento, California, part of the American River Parkway
 Discovery Park (Seattle), a park in the peninsular Magnolia neighborhood of Seattle, Washington, United States
 Discovery Park (constituency), in Tsuen Wan District, Hong Kong
 Discovery Park, a park at Copernicus Science Centre, Warsaw, Poland
 Discovery Park, a park in Omaha, Nebraska, United States
 "Discovery Park", a track on Gas Huffer's 1996 album The Inhuman Ordeal of Special Agent Gas Huffer
 Discovery Park Enterprise Zone, Kent, UK
 Discovery Water Park, a defunct waterpark in Newberry Springs, California, United States

See also
 Discovery Green, a public park in downtown Houston, Texas, United States